Falsidactus is a genus of longhorn beetles of the subfamily Lamiinae.

 Falsidactus parabettoni (Breuning, 1970)
 Falsidactus vittatus (Hintz, 1910)

References

Ancylonotini